Sabine Wils (born 31 May 1959) is a German politician. Since 2009, she has been a Member of the European Parliament for Die Linke.

Life and career 
Sabine Wils was born and grew up in Aachen, where she completed secondary school in 1977, before training as a midwife in Hamburg between 1978-80. In 1980, she began studying chemistry, and graduated with a chemistry degree in 1988. Subsequently, she worked between 1989-97 at the Environmental Agency in Hamburg, and from 2004 in the local authority for urban development and the environment. Since 1999, she has been a member of the Party of Democratic Socialism and its successor, Die Linke. Between 1980-89, she was a member of the German Communist Party and at times in the Socialist German Workers Youth and MSB Spartakus. She is married and has three children.

Politics 
In the European elections in 2009, where Die Linke won eight seats, Sabine Wils was elected as the second candidate on the party's list, behind party chairman Lothar Bisky. Since 14 July 2009, Wils is a member of the European Parliament and a full member of the Committee on the Environment, Public Health and Food Safety, substitute member of the Committee on Transport and Tourism, and a member of the delegation for relations with Switzerland, Iceland and Norway and the European Economic Area (EEA) Joint Parliamentary Committee.

References 

1959 births
Living people
The Left (Germany) MEPs
MEPs for Germany 2009–2014
21st-century women MEPs for Germany